The CARIFTA Games is an annual athletics competition founded by the Caribbean Free Trade Association (CARIFTA). The games was first held in 1972 and consists of track and field events including sprint races, hurdles, middle distance track events, jumping and throwing events, and relays. The Games has two age categories: under-17 (under-18 until 2017) and under-20. Only countries associated with CARIFTA may compete in the competition.

History
In 1972, Austin Sealy, then president of the Amateur Athletic Association of Barbados, inaugurated the CARIFTA Games to mark the transition from the Caribbean Free Trade Association (CARIFTA) to the Caribbean Community (CARICOM). CARIFTA was meant to enhance relations between the English-speaking countries of the Caribbean after the dissolution of the West Indies Federation, but the CARIFTA Games took that idea a step further, including the French and Dutch Antilles in an annual junior track and field championship meet.

The meet normally runs over three days during the Easter period and includes over 150 separate events. The Games has two age categories for boys and girls: under-17 and under-20, the latter in line with the International Association of Athletics Federations (IAAF) guidelines for junior athletes. The meet is run entirely under IAAF rules.

According to IAAF President, Lamine Diack, CARIFTA is "on par with the World Championships." The meet is considered one of the best development meets in world athletics. Having started out on grass tracks, with athletes staying in schools or other similar temporary shelter, the CARIFTA Games have come a long way. College and university coaches and scouts from the United States make their way to the Games each year, in a bid to identify up-and-coming athletes.

The Games have produced World Record holders, Usain Bolt, Darrel Brown, World and Olympic Champions such as Veronica Campbell-Brown of Jamaica, Kim Collins of St Kitts-Nevis and Pauline Davis-Thompson of the Bahamas, Alleyne Francique of Grenada and Obadele Thompson of Barbados. CARIFTA has spawned administrators like Dean Greenaway, President of the British Virgin Islands Athletics Association.

In the early years, a handful of territories (Barbados, Trinidad & Tobago, Bahamas, Martinique, Guadeloupe, Bermuda) had facilities appropriate for hosting what really is a world-class meet. Since 2000, though, Grenada, St Kitts-Nevis and St Lucia have built brand new stadia and hosted the CARIFTA Games. The Games have also been held on Tobago and in Montego Bay, Jamaica, which became the 14th different venue in 2011.

The CARIFTA Games are normally sponsored by regional companies including the National Gas Company of Trinidad & Tobago Ltd and Guardian Holdings. In 2009, telecommunications company, LIME Caribbean signed on as a presenting sponsor, providing finance to the local organising committee, direct assistance to national teams and live coverage of the Games on TV across the Caribbean, as well as via Internet streaming.

The Games are hosted directly under the auspices of the North and Central American and Caribbean Confederation of World Athletics, more commonly known as NACAC. Each country may enter two athletes per event and up to six athletes may be entered for relay events (with two acting as substitutes) and three athletes in the combined events such as pentathlon or heptathlon.

Games

Medal Totals Since 1990
As of 2019

CARIFTA Games Records

Jamaica has dominated the medals table at CARIFTA over the years. So too the record books. They hold records in 10 of the 21 Under-20 men's events contested all-time at CARIFTA, and hold or share 11 of the 17 Under-20 women's records. At the junior level, Jamaican boys own nine of the 17 records, whilst their girls possess a remarkable 10 of 16 marks in the Under-17 division. The oldest CARIFTA record in the books, though (at least for events still being contested in the modern Games), belongs to a Bermudan, Sonya Smith, whose Under-20 Javelin Throw performance of 53.98m has been on the books since 1979. The oldest boys' record is 15.03 m, the winning distance for Lyndon Sands of the Bahamas in the 1980 Under-17 Triple Jump.

Kareem Streete-Thompson went on to become one of the world's leading horizontal jumpers, but his CARIFTA performances have earned legendary status. In 1989, he set an Under-17 Long Jump record with a leap of 7.83 m, and a year later his 7.94 m was an Under-20 record, in his first year competing at that level for Cayman Islands. Both marks remain untouched. The women's horizontal jump records are almost as long-lived, Jackie Edwards' 1987 mark of 6.14 m was the Under-17 winning distance that year, and Daphne Saunders' leap of 6.93 m won her the 1989 title. Both ladies are from the Bahamas.

Men Under 20

Women Under 20

Boys Under 18

Girls Under 18

Boys Under 17

Girls Under 17

Austin Sealy Award Winners

Starting in 1977, the Austin Sealy Award is presented to the athlete adjudged the most outstanding, either in terms of record accomplishment, or quality of performance as compared to other top medallists. The Carifta Games Magazine issued for the 40th edition of the Carifta Games contains the article: "Most Outstanding Athletes over the years: Winners of the Austin Sealy Trophy", by David Miller, published on page 19 in part 2 and on page 24 in part 3. It displays a complete list of award winners. However, there are a couple of inconsistencies: in 2008 Barbados' hurdles sprinter Kierre Beckles won the trophy rather than Trinidadian hurdles sprinter Jehue Gordon, who on the other hand gained the trophy in 2010 rather than Grenadian sprinter Kirani James, the winner of 2009.

In 2002 Jamaican U17 sprinter Anneisha McLaughlin won the award rather Usain Bolt, who was awarded the trophy in 2003 and 2004.

Bahamian thrower Lavern Eve is reported to be the award winner in Kingston in 1982 and Martinique in 1983, rather than in 1981. In the year 1981, U17 sprinter Candy Ford from Bermuda, who then won three gold medals (100 m, 200 m, and 400 m), was awarded the so-called "Oscar Steele Challenge Trophy" for being the most outstanding athlete of the games.

* = Under-17 (before 2014) / Under-18 (after 2013)
† = Oscar Steele Challenge Trophy

See also
Caribbean Community

References

External links
 CARIFTA Games Records
Results of all CARIFTA Games in all events (last standing 2006): Under 20 Men, Under 20 Women, Under 17 Boys, Under 17 Girls

 
Athletics in the Caribbean
Recurring sporting events established in 1972
Athletics (track and field) competitions in North America
Politics and sports
Annual sporting events
CARIFTA